Dulder is a hamlet in the Dutch province of Overijssel. It is a part of the municipality of Dinkelland, and lies about 8 km north of Hengelo.

The statistical area includes the hamlets of 't Loo, Noordijk and Zoeke, and therefore the figure is too high. It was first mentioned in the late-10th century as Thuleri. The etymology is unclear. Im 1840, it was home to 932 people.

References

Populated places in Overijssel
Dinkelland